James Henry Evans (29 November 1894 – 25 April 1975) was a Welsh association footballer who played as a full back in the 1920s. He began his career with local side Rhyl Athletic before playing for Southern Football League side Ton Pentre and Southend United.

He remained with Southend when the club joined the Football League in 1920 and later captained the side. He joined Burnley in 1923 before finishing his professional career with Swansea Town.

He won four caps for the Wales national football team, the first of which was obtained against Scotland in 1922.

Career
Evans was born in Rhyl. His uncle Harry Stafford was also a footballer with Manchester United. Evans began his career with local amateur side Rhyl Athletic. He later joined Southern Football League club Ton Pentre. He joined Southend United, also of the Southern League, in 1919 and remained with the side when it joined the newly formed Football League Third Division in 1920. Evans developed a reputation as a penalty kick specialist during his time with the Southens and finished the 1921–22 season as the club's top goalscorer, scoring 10 of his 11 attempts during the campaign. He was later appointed club captain before eventually being sold to Burnley in April 1923 for £1000. The fee was a club record amount for Southend that stood for 15 years, until Doug Wright moved to Newcastle United in 1938.

Evans spent two years with Burnley, making 20 appearances before joining Swansea Town in 1925. He later finished his career with his first club, Rhyl Athletic.

During his career, Evans won four international caps for Wales. He made his debut in a 2–1 victory over Scotland on 4 February 1922 and played in his side's two further fixtures in the 1921–22 British Home Championship. He played one more match for Wales, against Scotland in 1923.

Later life
After retiring from playing, Evans worked as a trainer for Rhyl before working at the team's social club.

References

1894 births
1975 deaths
Sportspeople from Rhyl
Welsh footballers
Wales international footballers
Association football midfielders
Southend United F.C. players
Burnley F.C. players
Swansea City A.F.C. players
Southern Football League players
English Football League players
Ton Pentre F.C. players
Rhyl F.C. players